Gahnia beecheyi is a tussock-forming perennial in the family Cyperaceae, that is native to parts of Hawaii.

References

beecheyi
Plants described in 1867
Flora of Hawaii
Taxa named by Horace Mann Jr.